The 1970 Ohio State Buckeyes football team represented Ohio State University in the Big Ten Conference during the 1970 NCAA University Division football season. The Buckeyes won all nine games in the regular season and were ranked second in both major polls. Ohio State won the Big Ten title and a berth in the Rose Bowl in Pasadena on New Year's Day against the Stanford Indians, ranked No. 12 and champions of the Pac-8. The Buckeyes were upset 17–27 and finished with a 9–1 record.

This was the last year Ohio State played a nine-game regular-season schedule (the Big Ten first allowed a 10th regular season game in 1965). Many major colleges added an eleventh game in 1970, although no Big Ten school did so until the following season.

The Buckeyes were recognized as co-national champions, along with Texas, by the National Football Foundation at the end of the regular season. The teams were jointly awarded the MacArthur Bowl.

This was the fifth and last national title that head coach Woody Hayes won for the Buckeyes; they did not win another national championship until 2002.

Both Ohio State and Texas would go on to lose their bowl games; the 11–0–1 Nebraska Cornhuskers won the AP national championship when they finished No. 1 in final post-bowl AP Poll.

Schedule

Personnel

Depth chart

Game summaries

Texas A&M

Top-ranked Ohio State rolled up 513 yards of offense and scored touchdowns off five Texas A&M turnovers in a 56-13 rout. Fullback John Brockington scored twice and six other players accounted for touchdowns. The Buckeyes' defense forced three fumbles and an interception which led to four scores in an eight-minute span in the third quarter even though head coach Woody Hayes pulled the starters a little after halftime.

Duke

Michigan State

Minnesota

Illinois

Northwestern

Wisconsin

Purdue

Woody Hayes received a congratulatory phone call from President Richard Nixon after the game and then asked to speak to Fred Schram, who made the game-winning field goal. John Brockington carried the ball for 136 yards and Leo Hayden added 64 yards on 16 carries.

Michigan

Ohio State clinched a Big Ten title, a Rose Bowl berth and some measure of revenge for the 1969 upset.

Stanford

New Year's Day

In the Cotton Bowl in Dallas, top-ranked and defending national champion Texas was upset 24-11 by #6 Notre Dame, ending the Longhorns' 30-game winning streak.

Heavily-favored Ohio State could claim their second outright national title in three years that afternoon with a Rose Bowl victory over Stanford in Pasadena. Stanford (8-3) was led by quarterback Jim Plunkett, the 1970 Heisman Trophy winner.  The Indians had climbed to a 6-0 conference record and 8-1 overall, but lost their final two regular season games, to Sugar Bowl-bound Air Force and arch-rival California.  Stanford lost earlier in the season at home to Purdue, a team OSU defeated on the road.

The Buckeyes led Stanford by four points after three quarters, but were outscored 14-0 in the fourth quarter and lost 27-17. Later that night, #3 Nebraska won the Orange Bowl 17-12 over #5 LSU in Miami to claim the top spot in the AP writers poll.

1971 NFL draftees

References

Ohio State
Ohio State Buckeyes football seasons
College football national champions
Big Ten Conference football champion seasons
Ohio State Buckeyes football